Big Bang Theory is a 1998 album by the Canadian hard rock band Harem Scarem.

Track listing

Band members
Harry Hess – lead vocals, guitar, producer.
Pete Lesperance – lead guitar, backing vocals, producer.
Barry Donaghy – bass, backing vocals.
Darren Smith – drums, backing vocals.

References 

1998 albums
Harem Scarem albums
Warner Music Group albums